Leonard F. Suzio Jr. (born January 4, 1948) is an American politician from Connecticut.

Personal life 
Suzio attended the Wharton School of the University of Pennsylvania. Shortly after graduation, he married Kathryn. Suzio was active in the Connecticut Victim Advocate Advisory Committee, founded the consultancy firm GeoDataVision, and served on the Meriden Board of Education from 1995 to 2009.

Political career 
Suzio contested his first state legislative election in 2010, losing to incumbent state senator Thomas Gaffey. Gaffey resigned after he was charged with larceny. Suzio contested the subsequent special election, defeating Thomas Bruenn, and took office on February 28, 2011. He became the first Republican elected from the 13th Connecticut State Senate district since 1972. Suzio ran in the 2012 full-term elections, and was unseated by Danté Bartolomeo. Suzio challenged Bartolomeo again in 2014, and lost. Suzio launched another campaign in 2016, narrowly winning Bartolomeo's seat. Suzio announced that he would run for a second consecutive term in May 2018. Suzio lost his 2018 re-election bid to Democrat Mary Daugherty Abrams.

References

External links

|-

1948 births
Living people
Politicians from Meriden, Connecticut
Republican Party Connecticut state senators
School board members in Connecticut
Wharton School of the University of Pennsylvania alumni
21st-century American politicians
20th-century American politicians